Verdinaso (Verbond van Dietsche Nationaal-Solidaristen), sometimes rendered as Dinaso, was a small authoritarian and fascist political movement active in Belgium and, to a lesser extent, the Netherlands between 1931 to 1941.

Verdinaso was founded by Joris Van Severen, Jef François, Wies Moens, and Emiel Thiers on 6 October 1931 at a meeting in the Hôtel Richelieu in Ghent. It emerged from the Flemish Movement although, under Van Severen's leadership, it moved towards a novel authoritarian political ideology which he referred to as National Solidarism. The organisation had initially called for the reunification of Flanders with the Netherlands in a Greater Netherlands (Dietschland) but discarded this ideal in 1934 in favour of a wider corporatist ideology calling for the establishment of a federated authoritarian polity on the model of the Burgundian Netherlands which would incorporate the whole of Belgium and possibly Luxembourg. The party remained small but succeeded in attracting a number of young students and intellectuals inspired by Italian Fascism and Portugal's Estado Novo. It established a paramilitary wing in 1937, identified by its members' green shirts, known as the DINASO Militant Order (DINASO Militanten Orde).

Although Verdinaso never gained a mass following, its role in diminishing support for the established Flemish Front (Vlaamsche Front) at the 1929 elections led to the latter's decision to substantially reorganise itself in 1931 into the Flemish National League (Vlaamsch Nationaal Verbond) and to shift its ideological mainstream away from democratic reform and pacificism towards right-wing authoritarianism.

Character and history
The party was against the parliamentary democracy and eventually advocated a corporative society ruled by the Belgian King. As such it never participated in elections, and never became a strong political pressure group.

The Verdinaso originally advocated Flemish and Dutch nationalism. It proposed the union of Flanders with the Netherlands to form a Dietsland or Diets Rijk ("Dietsch Empire"), justifying this on the basis of a common history of the two lands under the Burgundians, and the emblematic rule of Charles I. In 1932, two of its leaders, François and Van Severen, were elected to the Chamber of Deputies; the same year, the party was joined by Victor Leemans, who wrote the work Het nationaal-socialisme, an apology for National Socialism.

After 1934, Verdinaso shifted its focus towards a Belgian identity circa 1939, becoming a bilingual (French-Dutch) movement, believing that the Belgian state should be founded on Roman Catholic corporatism – an economic model interpreted by Verdinaso from the Catholic social teaching, and akin to Integralism and the Action Française (an influence on Van Severen). The party virulently opposed Communism on the left and liberal capitalism on the right; it was also somewhat antisemitic, occasionally venting the opinion that Jews, as well as Freemasons constituted a hidden power working against the interests of Dietsland. The movement also shifted from proposing a union between Flanders and the Netherlands, to one between Belgium, Luxembourg and the Netherlands

In the elections of May 24, 1936, Verdinaso ran on a common list with other Flemish nationalists under the common denominator Vlaams Nationaal Block, gaining 13% of the vote and 16 deputy seats; in 1939, it peaked at 15% of the vote and 17 seats. The DINASO Militanten Orde had around 3,000 members, grouped under the leadership of François, and edited the newspapers Recht en Trouw and De Vlag (placed under the leadership of Moens).

When World War II broke out Van Severen was killed in Abbeville, France, suspected of being an agent of Nazi Germany, and as part of some executions of Rexists and Belgian communists (both groups were suspected of pro-German activism, justified by the Molotov–Ribbentrop Pact in the case of the latter). As a consequence, the Verdinaso lost a clear direction (despite Van Severen's replacement with François), and was eventually forced to join the Flemish National Union on May 5, 1941. Some of Verdinaso's members, who were advocating a strong Belgian authoritarian regime around King Leopold III, however joined the resistance against the German occupation.

Ideology

Verdinaso was based around the ideology of "National-Solidarism", which was a social doctrine that was strongly anti-Marxist and anti-capitalist. The party wished to reform society in an organic sense, that is to say, growing in a gradual, natural way with respect for its own nature, history and tradition. Verdinaso opposed both liberalism and parliamentary democracy. With the Verdinaso, Van Severen wanted to form a leading elite that would conquer power in the state through its style and action, rather than overthrow it. The Verdinaso leaned to the Conservative Revolution, more specifically with the Young Conservatives. There was also the influence of Charles Maurras's nationalist Action Française.

Notable members
 Jef François
 Ward Hermans
 Victor Leemans
 Wies Moens
 Joris Van Severen
 Luc Versteylen
 Jef Van Bilsen

References

Further reading

External links

L'Extrême droite en Flandre hier
Rues sans complexes  - Belgian fascists that some streets were still named after in 1999 (short biographies).

Defunct political parties in Belgium
Political parties established in 1931
Political parties disestablished in 1941
Fascist parties in Belgium
1931 establishments in Belgium
1941 disestablishments in Belgium
Anti-communist parties
Fascist parties
Flemish Movement
Belgian nationalism